Jacqueline Ann Duncan  (née Pentney, born 16 December 1931) is a British educator, and the founder of the Inchbald School of Design (when she was Jacqueline Inchbald).

Early life
She was born Jacqueline Ann Pentney on 16 December 1931, daughter of Sonia Pentney, She was educated at Convent of the Sacred Heart, Brighton, and the House of Citizenship, London.

Honours
She was appointed an OBE in 2013.

Personal life
In 1955, she married Michael Inchbald, they had one son and one daughter, and divorced in 1964. On 5 June 1974, she married Brigadier Peter Trevenen Thwaites (1926-1991), younger son of Lt. Col. N. G. Thwaites, who died in 1991. In 1994, she married Colonel Andrew Tobin Warwick Duncan, LVO, OBE.

References

External links
 Inchbald page for Duncan

1931 births
Living people
Officers of the Order of the British Empire
British company founders
British interior designers